The Russia national cricket team is the team that represents the Russian Federation in international cricket. In 2012, they were officially endorsed by the International Cricket Council (ICC) as an Affiliate member and were therefore entitled to participate in ICC Official events. Since 2017, they became an Associate Member In April 2018, the ICC decided to grant full Twenty20 International (T20I) status to all its members. Therefore, all Twenty20 matches played between Russia and other ICC Members after 1 January 2019 will be a full T20I.

History
The game was played in St Petersburg as early as the 1870s. In 1875, British residents of the city challenged the sailors of the Prince of Wales' Royal Yacht Osbourne to a match.

Cricket Russia is the sole governing body of cricket in Russia. It was founded in 2004. The Russia national cricket team saw their first home representative match against a touring side in 2007. Cricket Russia gained affiliation to the International Cricket Council in 2012.

In 2013 the Russian Cricket Federation was formed along with its 44 regional bodies. In 2013 Russia participated in an International cricket tournament hosted by Malta.

In July 2019, cricket was not included on Russia's list of official sports. This means that Cricket Russia did not receive government funding over the year. However, Cricket was included in a list of officially recognised sports in Russia in 2020, meaning that the federation could apply for government funding.

On 18 July 2021, Russia was suspended due to continued non-compliance with ICC Membership Criteria, was ordered to demonstrate compliance before the time of the next AGM or face having its membership of ICC terminated with immediate effect.

In 2022, Russia was expelled from the ICC for continued non-compliance with ICC Membership Criteria.

References

External links
Cricketrussia
RBTH
RBTH

Cricket in Russia
National cricket teams
Cricket
Russia in international cricket